Njena Surae Jarvis, better known by her stage name Njena Reddd Foxxx, is an American rapper, based in Brooklyn, New York.

Life and career

2011-2012: Career Beginnings and "Ima Read" 
Originally from Washington, D.C., Jarvis moved to New York in 2000. Before entering the world of rap, Jarvis was a full-time student at Cooper Union. Jarvis' first experience with rap was on her best friend Ojay Morgan's 2012 single "Ima Read". The song was recorded in one night, directly into a computer microphone, and hasn't been re-recorded since. On January 18, 2012, the song manifested into a music video directed by Ruben XYZ and quickly became a viral underground sensation.

In Spring of 2013, Jarvis and Katz opened twice for Die Antwoord and toured European festivals through to the end of Summer. The duo later went on to open for the British leg of Azealia Banks's Fantasea tour in late 2012. "Ima read" also became the soundtrack for Rick Owens' and Alex Mattsson's Fall-Winter 2012/2013 and Fall-Winter 2013 collections, respectively.

2013-present: Solo work and Needful Things 
Following the unexpected success of "Ima Read", Jarvis began penning several songs under her Reddd Foxxx persona, releasing them periodically on her SoundCloud account. Jarvis' first solo song, "Silly Bitch", was released as a promotional single off her debut mixtape Class President, which has yet to be released. In September 2013, Jarvis was featured in a short film, modeling for British designer Kitty Joseph in association with Absolut Vodka. Jarvis' latest single "Watercolour" is used throughout the film. On December 15, 2013, Jarvis released her highly anticipated debut EP Needful Things, in collaboration with London-based producer Jepordise, to rave reviews. Jarvis is expected to release her first full-length mixtape The Wiz, which samples all of the songs featured in the 1978 feature film The Wiz, sometime later this year.

Discography

Extended plays
Needful Things (2013)

Mixtapes
Class President (TBR)
The Wiz (TBR)

Singles
"Ima Read" (with Zebra Katz) (2012)
"Silly Bitch" (2012)
"Flex" (2012)
"Hold My Purse" (feat. Goodluck) (2012)
"Dominos" (2012)
"Watercolour" (2013)

Music videos

References

External links
 Official website
 Njena Reddd Foxxx on SoundCloud
 Njena Reddd Foxxx on Twitter
 Njena Reddd Foxxx on YouTube

21st-century American singers
American women rappers
African-American women rappers
East Coast hip hop musicians
Feminist musicians
Living people
Rappers from Brooklyn
Songwriters from New York (state)
21st-century American rappers
21st-century American women singers
Year of birth missing (living people)
African-American songwriters
21st-century African-American women singers
21st-century women rappers